Neadmore is an unincorporated community in Clark County, Illinois, United States. Neadmore is south of Martinsville.

References

Unincorporated communities in Clark County, Illinois
Unincorporated communities in Illinois